The Abdals are a largely Turkish-speaking ethnic group found in much of Anatolia and parts of the Balkans and Syria, who follow an itinerant lifestyle. This lifestyle is closely connected with the activity of music making at weddings and circumcision parties. Other occupations associated with the Abdal include tinning, basket making and sieve manufacture.

Names
Abdals use the endonym Teber. Abdals were registered in Ottoman records as Turkoman Gypsies, which denoted Abdals’ tribal affiliations with Turkomans but different ethnic or social origin.

History 
According to Orhan Köprülü, Abdals of Turkey might be descended from the Hepthalites. Albert von Le Coq mentions the relation between Abdals of Adana and Äynus of East Turkestan, by them having some common words, and by both referring to themselves as Abdals and speaking an exclusive language among themselves.

The three most remarkable characteristics of the group are its close relationship with the Alevi sect, its use of a secret language (Abdoltili/Teberce) or argot and its wide distribution. It seems that the name Abdal was associated with Alevi dervishes of Central Anatolia, whose existence is first recorded in the 16th century. These Abdalan-ı Rum were extreme Alevis practising celibacy and withdrawal from the world. Their unorthodox behavior led to their suppression by the Ottoman authorities. According to the Abdal themselves, their ancestors once came from North India and went to Afghanistan-Iran-Central Asia and then to Ottoman Anatolia and intermarried with tribes of Turkmen. They say they are not like the Romani people in Turkey and distance themselves from them.

Language
Abdals in Turkey mostly speak Turkish, specifically a dialect with additional vocabulary. The Abdal language consists of borrowing from Hindustani language, Persian with some Rumelian Romani words with an essentially Turkish and Turkmen grammar.

Society and culture
Abdals would traditionally have a symbiotic relationship with Turkmen but also Kurdish tribes, playing a particular role as musicians, entertainers, minstrels, jewelers and magicians, whereas they would be accommodated by the people they were living together with. However, Abdals wouldn't intermarry with these people yet they would be allowed to stay within the larger community.

See also 
 Tahtacı
 Hephthalites
 Lyuli
 Garachi

References 

Abdal (caste)

Ethnic groups in Turkey
Dom in the Middle East
Dom in Europe
Modern nomads
Romani in Turkey
Turkish people
Ethnic groups in the Middle East